The Boardwalk Art Show is a juried major outdoor visual arts show held annually since 1956 on the beach boardwalk of Virginia Beach, Virginia and it is sponsored by the Virginia Museum of Contemporary Art.

History 
Starting in 1956, the Virginia Museum of Contemporary Art (MoCA) began staging what is now ranked as "one of the top 15 Fine Art Shows of the Decade" by Sunshine Artist magazine, and an event which grew both in critical reputation as well as attendance, with an estimated 200,000 visitors during the three-day show.

The show now exhibits the works of about 200 juried artists from all over the United States, covering categories spanning most of the visual arts genres such as painting, drawing, printmaking, sculpture, fiber arts, and glass, as well as high-end crafts such as clothing, jewelry, and furniture. The show is now held during the month of October.

Process 
The artists are selected via a curated, juried process, where pre-selected jurors (which are different each year) review applications from all over the nation to finally select and invite about 200 artists. The jurors also award about $25,000 in prizes, including a Best in Show prize which ranges from $5,000 - $10,000.

Reception 
The show has been characterized as "one of the Premier art shows on the East Coast actually in the country" and as "an honor to be here for all of the artists." Art critic Mark St. John Erickson described some of the Best of Show winners' art as "some surprisingly solid and often provocative viewing."

References 

1956 establishments in the United States
Culture of Virginia Beach, Virginia
Tourist attractions in Virginia Beach, Virginia